Eligmodermini is a tribe of beetles in the subfamily Cerambycinae, containing the following genera and species:

 Genus Acanthoibidion
 Acanthoibidion chevrolatii (White, 1855)
 Genus Alienus
 Alienus curiosus Galileo & Martins, 2010
 Genus Eligmoderma
 Eligmoderma aragua Martins & Galileo, 2009
 Eligmoderma convexicolle Aurivillius, 1923
 Eligmoderma ibidionoides Thomson, 1864
 Eligmoderma minuta Martins & Galileo, 2009
 Eligmoderma politum Nonfried, 1895
 Eligmoderma trifasciatum Aurivillius, 1923
 Eligmoderma ziczac Nonfried, 1895
 Genus Limozota
 Limozota virgata Pascoe, 1866
 Genus Tucanti
 Tucanti plumicornis Martins & Galileo, 2009

References

 
Cerambycinae